V. C. Kabeer is an Indian politician, Gandhian and current president of Gandhi Darshan Samithi. He served as a minister in Third Nayanar ministry from 2000-2001. He is a member of Kerala Legislative Assembly for several years representing Ottappalam constituency.

Early life
V. C. Kabeer was born as the son of Shri. Cheku Haji and Smt. Sulekha Umma on 10 May 1943. A teacher by profession, he came to active politics through the students' wing of the Congress and Youth Congress. He had also been jailed for twenty days, in connection with the Vimochana Samaram.

Political career
V. C. Kabeer became elected to the 6th Kerala Legislative Assembly, from Ottappalam constituency, as an INC(U) Member. He represented the same constituency subsequently as Congress(S) Member in the 7th, 9th and 10th Kerala Legislative Assembly. He continued to represent Ottappalam constituency in the 11th Kerala Legislative Assembly, as a Member of NCP. But he resigned his membership in the 11th Kerala Legislative Assembly on 11 August 2005 to rejoin Congress. In the Ministry headed by Shri. E. K. Nayanar, Shri V.C. Kabeer was the Minister for Health and Sports from 19 January 2000 to 13 May 2001. He contested in the subsequent Kerala Legislative Assembly election as an INC candidate from his long term fortress Ottapalam constituency. However, he failed to gain the upperhand and eventually lost.

Positions held
 President Gandhi Darshan Samithi
 Member KPCC
 Secretary, District Youth Congress (1964-68)
 President, District Youth Congress Committee (1970-78)
 Secretary, Palakkad DCC (1977-80)
 President, DCC (S) (1982-92)
 Secretary KPCC(S) (1992-2000)

See also
 A. C. Shanmughadas
 A. K. Saseendran
 A. A. Rahim

References

Malayali politicians
Kerala politicians
1943 births
Living people